Lisa Raymond and Rennae Stubbs were the defending champions but they competed with different partners that year, Raymond with Lindsay Davenport and Stubbs with Elena Bovina.

Bovina and Stubbs lost in the quarterfinals to Jelena Dokić and Nadia Petrova.

Davenport and Raymond won in the final 3–6, 6–4, 6–1 against Kim Clijsters and Ai Sugiyama.

Seeds
Champion seeds are indicated in bold text while text in italics indicates the round in which those seeds were eliminated.

Draw

Final

Top half

Bottom half

Qualifying

Qualifying seeds

Qualifiers
  Flavia Pennetta /  María Emilia Salerni

Lucky losers

Qualifying draw

External links
 Official results archive (ITF)
 Official results archive (WTA)

2003 Pacific Life Open
Pacific Life Open